Werner Pidde (born 28 July 1953 in Waltershausen) is a German politician. He is a member of the  Social Democratic Party's delegation in the Landtag of Thuringia since 1994.

See also
List of Social Democratic Party of Germany politicians

Notes

External links

 Personal Page

1953 births
Social Democratic Party of Germany politicians
Living people